Alexander Breckenridge Craig (born 2 April 1886 – 16 February 1951) was a footballer who played for Rangers, Greenock Morton and Ireland as a left back.

He is one of only four players born in what is now the Republic of Ireland to play for Rangers; the others were Alex Stevenson, Jon Daly and James Lowry McAuley.

Career

Club
Galway-born Craig had moved to Scotland with his family by the time of the 1891 United Kingdom Census, residing in the Hutchesontown district of Glasgow. He joined Rangers from junior side Rutherglen Glencairn in January 1905. His initial seasons at Ibrox Park coincided with a rare lean spell for the club, and he left without a single major winner's medal. The closest he came was in 1905 when Rangers lost a replayed Scottish Cup final 3–1 to Third Lanark. In his last season, 1910–11, Rangers did win the league title, but Craig made just a single appearance and so was not entitled to a medal.

By the time of his move to Greenock Morton, Craig was proving his versatility by slotting in regularly on the left-hand side of defence. In May 1914 he returned to Rangers, making his second debut in a Glasgow Charity Cup Final defeat by Celtic. He was a regular in the Gers side for the initial war-time campaign and was still on the club's books when hostilities ended though his last appearances were made in April 1916. Still without a significant club honour, Craig finished his playing days in the Western League with Johnstone.

International
Craig's international career began as he reaped the benefits of Billy McCracken's expulsion by the Irish FA. He made his Ireland debut in a 3–1 defeat by England in February 1908, playing in each of that year's British Home Championship ties at right-back. But it was at left-back that Craig played during each of the 1914 Home Championship games as Ireland claimed the title outright for the first time.

References

External links

1886 births
1951 deaths
Association footballers from County Galway
Irish association footballers (before 1923)
Pre-1950 IFA international footballers
Scottish Football League players
Rangers F.C. players
Johnstone F.C. players
Greenock Morton F.C. players
Rutherglen Glencairn F.C. players
Scottish Football League representative players 
Association football fullbacks
Scottish Junior Football Association players
Footballers from Glasgow
People from Gorbals